FORCE11 is an international coalition of researchers, librarians, publishers and research funders working to reform or enhance the research publishing and communication system. Initiated in 2011 as a community of interest on scholarly communication, FORCE11 is a registered 501(c)(3) organization based in the United States but with members and partners around the world. Key activities include an annual conference, the Scholarly Communications Institute and a range of working groups.

History 
FORCE11 grew out of the FORC Workshop held in Dagstuhl, Germany in August 2011. This meeting resulted in the collaborative creation of a white paper which summarized the problems of scholarly communication and proposed a vision to address them.

Activities 
Through various working groups FORCE11 has undertaken a range of activities to improve the standards, interoperability and functionality of digital research communications and developed various statements on principles and policies for best practice. These include:

 FAIR Data Principles: The development of a set of principles based on making data Findable, Accessible, Interoperable, and Reusable (FAIR)
 Research Resource Identification Initiative (RRID): supporting new guidelines and identifiers in biomedical publications
 Joint Declaration of Data Citation Principles (JDDCP): intended to help achieve widespread, uniform human and machine accessibility of deposited data through data citation
 Software citation principles

See also 

Australian Open Access Strategy Group  (AOASG)
Coalition for Networked Information (CNI)
Open Access Scholarly Publishers Association (OASPA)
Scholarly Publishing and Academic Resources Coalition (SPARC)

References 

Open access (publishing)
Scholarly communication
2011 establishments in Germany